J² is a collaborative album by Justin Broadrick and Jarboe, released on March 18, 2008 by The End Records.

Track listing

Personnel
Adapted from the J² liner notes.
Musicians
 Justin Broadrick – guitar, programming, production, mixing
 Jarboe – lead vocals, keyboards
Production and additional personnel
 Peter Tsakiris – cover art
 Cedric Victor – design

Release history

References 

2008 albums
Collaborative albums
Justin Broadrick albums
Jarboe albums
The End Records albums
Albums produced by Justin Broadrick